10 metre air rifle (N.B. For "Meter" in this article – read "Metre") is an International Shooting Sports Federation (ISSF) shooting event, shot at a bullseye target over a distance of  using a  calibre air rifle with a maximum weight of . It is one of the ISSF-governed shooting sports included in the Summer Olympics since the 1984 Los Angeles Games.

Shots are fired from the standing position only, as opposed to some other airgun disciplines such as for three positions (popular in the United States) or in disabled sports, which allows sitting and prone positions.  Due to the low recoil of air guns and the need for stability, the shooter frequently adopts a deliberately lordotic and scoliotic posture, which allows the non-dominant elbow to be rested against the chest to support the forearm and improves the stability of the shooting stance.  The use of specialized rigidly padded vest is allowed to prevent chronic back injury, which can be caused by prolonged asymmetric load on the spinal column.

The major competitions are the Olympic Games every four years and the ISSF World Shooting Championships every four years (the Games and the Championships are held two years apart). In addition, the event is included in the ISSF World Cup series, the ISSF World Cup Final, in continental championships, and in many other international and national competitions. It is an indoor sport. In many clubs and ranges, electronic targets are now being used instead of the traditional paper targets.

Scores in 10 meter air rifle have improved rapidly during the last few decades. During the 1970s, technical advances in the employed match air rifles made the ISSF, known as the International Shooting Union or UIT back then, decide to significantly reduce the size of the 10 meter air rifle target to its current dimensions.

Rules
Until 2013, the maximum achievable aggregate score (qualification + final) was 709 for men (600 + 109.0) and 509 for women (400 + 109.0). The score for the qualification used integers (10 as highest score per shot) and the final stage included decimals (10.9 as highest score per shot). No top competitor achieved an official perfect aggregate score under these rules.

Under rules introduced in 2013, the qualification scores that used to be combined with the finals scores for competition results were deleted, and the best eight competitors started all over again. In the 20 shots final, the highest achievable final score was 218.0 points. No top competitor achieved an official perfect final score under these rules.

Rules introduced in 2018 ended the competition format differences between male and female athletes. Also, the final was changed to 24 shots (5 shots + 5 shots + 14 shots elimination phase). In the final, the highest achievable final score is 261.6 points. Up to 2020, no top competitor has achieved an official perfect final score under these rules. The current world record is 252.8 for men and 252.9 for women.

Qualification Round

Pre 2013 qualification rules
The course of fire was an unlimited number of sighter shots followed by 60 competition shots for men or 40 competition shots for women, all fired within 75 minutes for men or 50 minutes for women. During this initial or qualification phase a maximum of 10 points was awarded for each shot. Top competitors sometimes achieved maximum results (a "possible") for the initial or qualification phase (600 for men and 400 for women). The majority of these full marks were achieved at non-directly ISSF supervised international and national-level matches and championships, where official ISSF recognized world records cannot be set. This leads to many national records in fact being equal to the world records.

2013 to 2018 qualification rules
The course of fire was 60 competition shots for men or 40 competition shots for women, all fired within 75 minutes for men or 50 minutes for women. During this initial or qualification phase a maximum of 10.9 points was awarded for each shot. The highest possible 60 shots score for men was 654.0 points and for woman 436.0 points.

2018 qualification rules
ISSF rules introduced in 2018 ended the gender differences, expanding the 40 shots qualification phase for women into 60 shots, setting the highest possible 60 shots score at 654.0 points.

Finals

Pre 2013 finals rules
The top eight shooters from the qualification round moved on to a finals event consisting of 10 shots – each decimal scored to a maximum of 10.9 – with the cumulative score determining the winner (qualification + finals score). Every scoring ring is 5 mm wide and sub-divided in 0.5 mm (≈ 0.1719 MOA) increments in 10 "subrings". Like the other scoring rings the maximum of 10.9 is derived from an additional set of 10 "subrings" within the center 10-point circle, increasing in 0.1 point value as the rings approach the center of the target.

2013 to 2018 finals  rules
In November 2012, The ISSF announced other finals rules. This finals rules had the best eight shooters starting from zero, eliminating the qualification scores that used to be combined with the finals scores for competition results. The format consisted of 20 finals shots scored in 0.1 point value as the rings approach the center of the target, setting the highest possible 20 shots score at 218.0 points.

2018 finals rules
Since 2018 the ISSF finals rules rank the eight best shooters starting from zero, eliminating the qualification scores. The format consists of 2 series of 5 shots each, to be fired within 250 seconds per series. This is followed by 14 single shots each fired on command with 50 seconds for each shot. Eliminations of the lowest scoring finalists begin after the tenth shot (series + first 2 single shots) and continue after every two shots, until the gold and silver medalists are decided. There is a total of 24 finals shots, setting the highest possible 24 shots score at 261.6 points. If there is a tie for the lowest ranking athlete to be eliminated, the tied athletes will fire additional tie-breaking single shots until the tie is broken.

Equipment
For the 10 meter air rifle and air pistol disciplines, match-grade diabolo pellets are used. These pellets are wadcutter, meaning the pellet head is nearly completely flat, which leaves smooth-edged round holes in paper targets and allows easy gauging for scoring. Match pellets are offered in tins and more elaborate packagings that avoid deformation and other damage that could impair their uniformity.

Match air rifle shooters are encouraged to perform shooting group tests with their gun clamped in a machine rest to establish which particular match pellet type performs best for their particular air gun.

However at higher and top competitive levels, even these variations are thought too coarse-grained and match pellets are batch-tested; that is, the specific gun is mounted in a machine rest test rig and pellets from a specific production run on a specific machine with the same ingredients fed into the process (a batch) are test-fired through the gun. Many different batches will be tested in this manner, and the pellets which give the smallest consistent group size without fliers (shots which fall outside of the main group) will be selected (small but inconsistent group sizes are not useful to a top competitor); and the shooter will then purchase several tens of thousands of pellets from that batch. Unbatched ammunition, especially if the air gun is not regularly cleaned, is generally thought to be capable of only  diameter group sizes. Batch-testing match pellets for a particular gun is not generally thought to be worthwhile until the shooter reaches a high proficiency level (around the 95% level i.e 570 for the qualification round).

The occurrence of high scores in modern times is mainly due to the continuous development of the employed match air rifles from spring-piston type designs into single-stroke pneumatic and then regulated pre-charged pneumatic (PCP) designs. Modern PCP match rifles from the leading manufacturers all feature regulated PCP powerplants to minimize shot-to-shot output pressure variations and hence muzzle velocity inconsistency, mechanical or electronic match triggers offering low shot development time (at low lock times factors like the dwell time of the pellet in the barrel become influential), shoot practically recoilless and vibration free, exhibit minimal movement and balance shifts and can be tailored by an adjustable aluminum stock and other user interfaces like the non-magnifying target shooting diopter and globe sighting line and various accessories to the individual shooters personal preferences to promote comfortable and accurate shooting from a standing position.
Combined with appropriate match pellets, these rifles produce a consistent 10-ring performance, so a sub-10.0 average result can be attributed to the participant and at 2019 top competition level a 10.5 average result can be regarded as excellent.

Gallery

World Championships, Men

World Championships, Men Team

World Championships, Women

World Championships, Women Team

World Championships, Mixed Team

World Championships, total medals

Current world records

Post 1 January 2013 World and Olympic Records

Post 1 January 2018 World and Olympic Records

References

ISSF World Records
ISSF Official Statutes Rules and Regulations

ISSF shooting events
Rifle shooting sports
Pneumatic weapons